Johan Herman Thoresen (14 July 1832  – 28 January 1914) was a Norwegian judge.

He was born in Herøy to priest Hans Konrad Thoresen and Sara Margrethe Daae. He graduated as cand.jur. in 1854, and was named as a Supreme Court Justice from 1884.

He was decorated Knight, First Class of the Order of St. Olav in 1892, and Commander in 1897.

References

1832 births
1914 deaths
People from Møre og Romsdal
Supreme Court of Norway justices